Mario, who serves as Nintendo's mascot, is a fictional character created by game designer Shigeru Miyamoto and voiced by Charles Martinet. This is a list of video games where the character Mario plays a part, either as the protagonist, antagonist, supporting character, as part of an ensemble cast, as a cameo, or in a game within a game. It does not include mere references to the character, such as the portraits of Mario found in The Legend of Zelda: A Link to the Past or The Legend of Zelda: Ocarina of Time.

The year indicated is the year the game was first released, most commonly in Japan; games have sometimes released years later in other regions of the world. The list includes ports, remakes and compilations, but not Virtual Console releases.

List

See also

List of Mario franchise characters

References

External links
A list of games on the Super Mario Wiki

Video games
 
Nintendo-related lists
Lists of video games by franchise
Video games by featured character